Enischorhynchus is an extinct genus of prehistoric bony fish that lived during the Turonian of southern Texas.

See also

 Prehistoric fish
 List of prehistoric bony fish

References

Tselfatiiformes
Late Cretaceous fish
Prehistoric ray-finned fish genera